The 1988 Richmond Spiders football team was an American football team that represented the University of Richmond as a member of the Yankee Conference during the 1988 NCAA Division I-AA football season. In their ninth season under head coach Dal Shealy, Richmond compiled a 4–7 record, with a mark of 2–6 in conference play, finishing in ninth place in the Yankee.

Schedule

References

Richmond
Richmond Spiders football seasons
Richmond Spiders